Kasian, Kaseyan, Kasiyan, Kasyan orKhasian may refer to:

Kasian, Chaypareh, West Azerbaijan Province
Kasian, Urmia, West Azerbaijan Province
Kasian-e Rostam Khani
Qaleh-ye Kasian
Qanat-e Kasian
Kasi (Pashtun tribe)